Ornipholidotos teroensis is a butterfly in the family Lycaenidae. It is found in southern Uganda and north-western Tanzania. The habitat consists of forests.

References

Butterflies described in 1957
Ornipholidotos